Nathaniel Meade Bunker was a member of the Wisconsin State Assembly.

Biography
Bunker was born on August 31, 1817 in Milan, New York. In 1885, he moved to Troy, Walworth County, Wisconsin. He died on March 25, 1889.

Assembly career
Bunker was a member of the Assembly during the 1875 session. Previously, he had been an unsuccessful candidate in 1871. He was a Republican.

References

People from Dutchess County, New York
People from Troy, Walworth County, Wisconsin
Republican Party members of the Wisconsin State Assembly
1817 births
1889 deaths
19th-century American politicians